Mustard compounds can refer to:

 Sulfur mustard (mustard gas)
 Nitrogen mustard